Canebrake is a historic plantation house in Ferriday, Louisiana. The house was located inside a  plantation west of Mississippi River and east of Lake St. John.

The house was built in c.1840 and has been remodeled in 1850-1860 and in 1910, after the plantation was purchased by Arthur Meserve.

The house and the nearby  area, comprising several outbuildings was listed on the National Register of Historic Places on August 29, 1982.

See also
National Register of Historic Places listings in Concordia Parish, Louisiana

References

Houses on the National Register of Historic Places in Louisiana
Houses completed in 1840
Buildings and structures in Concordia Parish, Louisiana
1840 establishments in Louisiana